In Greek mythology, the name Clytie (Ancient Greek: Κλυτίη, Ionic) or Clytia (Attic and other dialects) may refer to:

Clytie (Oceanid), known for her unrequited love for Helios. Out of jealousy, Clytie arranged the death of Leucothoe, Helios' lover.
Clytie, daughter of Pandareus and sister of Cameiro. Cameiro and Clytie lost their parents to the wrath of gods and were reared by Aphrodite. They received gifts from other Olympic goddesses as well: wisdom and beauty from Hera, high stature from Artemis, skill in handiwork from Athena. When Aphrodite left for Olympus to arrange for the sisters to get happily married in the future, the girls, left without supervision, were abducted by the Harpies and given by them to the Erinyes.
Clytie, daughter of Merops, wife of Eurypylus of Cos, mother of Chalcon and Antagoras. She received Demeter as guest.
Clytie, daughter of Amphidamas and possible mother of Pelops by Tantalus.
Clytie, possible mother of Myrtilus by Hermes.
Clytie, one of the Niobids.
Clytie, in one source called mother of Thalpius by Eurytus instead of Theraiphone.
Clytie or Phthia, concubine of Amyntor, the cause of a conflict between him and his son Phoenix.
Clytia, wife of Aeeta (Aeetes) and mother of Medea. Otherwise, the wife of Aeetes was called Ipsia, Idyia, Asterodeia, Hecate, Neaera or Eurylyte.
Clytemnestra is occasionally abbreviated to Clytie

Notes

References 

 Apollonius Rhodius, Argonautica translated by Robert Cooper Seaton (1853–1915), R. C. Loeb Classical Library Volume 001. London, William Heinemann Ltd, 1912. Online version at the Topos Text Project.
 Apollonius Rhodius, Argonautica. George W. Mooney. London. Longmans, Green. 1912. Greek text available at the Perseus Digital Library.
 Diodorus Siculus, The Library of History translated by Charles Henry Oldfather. Twelve volumes. Loeb Classical Library. Cambridge, Massachusetts: Harvard University Press; London: William Heinemann, Ltd. 1989. Vol. 3. Books 4.59–8. Online version at Bill Thayer's Web Site
 Diodorus Siculus, Bibliotheca Historica. Vol 1–2. Immanel Bekker. Ludwig Dindorf. Friedrich Vogel. in aedibus B. G. Teubneri. Leipzig. 1888–1890. Greek text available at the Perseus Digital Library.
 Gaius Julius Hyginus, Astronomica from The Myths of Hyginus translated and edited by Mary Grant. University of Kansas Publications in Humanistic Studies. Online version at the Topos Text Project.
 Gaius Julius Hyginus, Fabulae from The Myths of Hyginus translated and edited by Mary Grant. University of Kansas Publications in Humanistic Studies. Online version at the Topos Text Project.
 Homer, The Odyssey with an English Translation by A.T. Murray, PH.D. in two volumes. Cambridge, MA., Harvard University Press; London, William Heinemann, Ltd. 1919. . Online version at the Perseus Digital Library. Greek text available from the same website.
 Pausanias, Description of Greece with an English Translation by W.H.S. Jones, Litt.D., and H.A. Ormerod, M.A., in 4 Volumes. Cambridge, MA, Harvard University Press; London, William Heinemann Ltd. 1918. . Online version at the Perseus Digital Library
 Pausanias, Graeciae Descriptio. 3 vols. Leipzig, Teubner. 1903.  Greek text available at the Perseus Digital Library.
 Pseudo-Apollodorus, The Library with an English Translation by Sir James George Frazer, F.B.A., F.R.S. in 2 Volumes, Cambridge, MA, Harvard University Press; London, William Heinemann Ltd. 1921. . Online version at the Perseus Digital Library. Greek text available from the same website.
 Theocritus, Idylls from The Greek Bucolic Poets translated by Edmonds, J M. Loeb Classical Library Volume 28. Cambridge, MA. Harvard Univserity Press. 1912. Online version at theoi.com
 Theocritus, Idylls edited by R. J. Cholmeley, M.A. London. George Bell & Sons. 1901. Greek text available at the Perseus Digital Library.

Niobids
Princesses in Greek mythology
Queens in Greek mythology
Anatolian characters in Greek mythology